Vadivel Suresh (or Wadivelu Suresh) is a Sri Lankan politician, and a member of the Parliament of Sri Lanka

References

Living people
Sri Lankan Hindus
Members of the 13th Parliament of Sri Lanka
Members of the 15th Parliament of Sri Lanka
Members of the 16th Parliament of Sri Lanka
Government ministers of Sri Lanka
United People's Freedom Alliance politicians
Sri Lanka Freedom Party politicians
1971 births